Bill Bergan (April 1, 1942 – November 22, 2022) was an American college athletics coach. A two-time NCAA championship-winning head coach with the Iowa State Cyclones track and field, he also worked with the Iowa State Cyclones Cross Country team. He was the founder and CEO of Ames, Iowa-based Championship Productions.

Bergan died on November 22, 2022, at the age of 80.

References

1942 births
2022 deaths
Iowa State Cyclones track and field coaches
Iowa State University faculty
People from Cedar Falls, Iowa